Dan Smith (8 April 1869 – 27 February 1926) was a South African international rugby union player who played as a forward.

References

1869 births
1926 deaths
South African rugby union players
South Africa international rugby union players
Rugby union forwards
Rugby union players from Durban
Griquas (rugby union) players